Of Mind and Music (previously titled Una Vida: A Fable of Music and Mind) is a 2014 American drama independent film based on the 2009 novel Una Vida: A Fable of Music and the Mind by Nicolas Bazan, and written by Richie Adams and Nicolas Bazan. The film is directed by Richie Adams and stars Aunjanue Ellis, Joaquim de Almeida, Bill Cobbs, Sharon Lawrence, and Ruth Negga.

Plot
Renowned Neuroscientist Dr. Alvaro Cruz (Joaquim De Almeida) returns home from a lecture in Paris, heartbroken and disillusioned. In his absence, his mother has succumbed to Alzheimer's disease. Nothing that his research or science could do could stop this from happening.

As he decides to take some time off work and reconnect with the love of music that he shared with his mother finding solace in the music that permeates New Orleans' French Quarter, he hears the mesmerizing voice of Una Vida (Aunjanue Ellis) for the first time. After repeat visits to hear her sing, he realizes that she is suffering from Alzheimer's disease and that her unconventional "family" cannot cope with her declining health.

Cruz puzzles his wife, Angela (Sharon Lawrence), by seeking out Una Vida's long lost son in hopes of finally giving her resolution to the grief, loss and longing that has overshadowed her difficult but also beautiful life.

Cast
 Joaquim de Almeida... Dr. Alvaro Cruz
 Aunjanue Ellis... Una Vida
 Bill Cobbs... Stompleg
 Ruth Negga... Jessica
 Sharon Lawrence... Angela Cruz
 Andre Royo... Kenny
 Marcus Lyle Brown... Sam

Production

Development

Of Mind and Music was shot in New Orleans, Louisiana. Director Richie Adams along with Dr. Bazan (novel writer, screenplay writer, and producer), and producer Brent Caballero chose the filming locations in New Orleans as between the three of them they found that at least one had a connection to someone who owned a particular location where they shot a scene.

References

External links

2014 films
2014 drama films
American drama films
American independent films
Films set in New Orleans
2010s English-language films
2010s American films